Hammam Debagh is a district in Guelma Province, Algeria. It was named after its capital, the spa of Hammam Debagh.

Municipalities
The district is further divided into 3 municipalities, which is the highest number in the province:
Hammam Debagh
Roknia 
Bou Hamdane

References 

 
Districts of Guelma Province